Play It Again is the debut extended play by American singer and rapper Becky G, released for digital download through RCA Records and Kemosabe Records on July 13, 2013.

It was preceded by the promotional singles "Play It Again", released on May 6, 2013, and "Built for This", released on November 6, 2013, both with a music video on her YouTube channel. Its official lead single, "Can't Get Enough", was released on March 29, 2014, and features Cuban-American rapper Pitbull.

The EP was recorded in Los Angeles during 2012 and 2013. Dr. Luke served as the album's executive producer with additional production and songwriting by Max Martin, Will.i.am, Pitbull,  the JAM and the Cataracs.

Track listing

Charts

References 

2013 debut EPs
Becky G albums
Pop music EPs
Hip hop EPs
EPs by American artists
Kemosabe Records albums